Rudbar District was one of the historical-geographical and administrative territories.

History 

Rudbar district was present in Sabirabad, Saatly, Neftchala and Hajigabul Districts.

The district governor was Dargha Mammadkhan.

Population 

In 18 settlements in 1821 (Javad, Dabbaglar, Balvan, Qarali, Yenikend, Gazili, Ahmedbeyli, Guruzmanli, Abdulyan, Yenica, Mustafali, Ahtaci, Meyniman, Kovratlı, Surra Atamoghlan, Surra Aghabedal, Surra Mammad, Surra Abdulla bey, Alimadatli) 422 families lived.

Economy 
Residents of the Rudbar district were engaged in agriculture and sericulture.

See also 
 Qalaqayın
 Mughan district

Source 
 Описание Ширванской провинции, составленное въ 1820 году, по распоряжению главноуправляющего въ Грузии А.П.Ермолова, генералмаером князем Мадатовымъ и действи- тельным статским советником Могилевским. — Тифлис: типо- графия Главного Управления наместника Кавказского, 1867. — Number of pages:  287.

References 

Shirvan Khanate